Brian Lee Diemer (born October 10, 1961, in Grand Rapids, Michigan) is a former American track and field athlete, who mainly competed in the 3000 metre steeplechase during his career. He was high school state champion in the mile while running at South Christian High School in Grand Rapids, Michigan.  He graduated from the University of Michigan in 1983 after taking third in the 2 mile at the NCAA Indoor Track and Field Championships, held in nearby Detroit.  He won the outdoor 1983 NCAA 3000m Steeplechase in a time of 8:26.95.

He competed for the United States in the 1984 Summer Olympics held in Los Angeles, United States in the 3000 metre steeplechase where he won the bronze medal in a career best time of 8:14.06.  He ran in the 1988 Summer Olympics, finishing seventh in his semi final.  He made his third Olympic team in 1992, going on to qualify for the final, where he finished seventh (in 8:18.77).  He had fine showings at two World Championships in which he participated, finishing fourth in the 1987 World Championships in Athletics (in 8:14.46) and fifth at the 1991 World Championships in Athletics (in 8:17.76). Diemer won four The Athletics Congress (TAC) and U.S. Track and Field (USATF) championships over that time (1988, 1989, 1990 and 1992).  In 1989 he received the Glenn Cunningham Award as the outstanding American male distance runner for the year.

He now coaches at Calvin University in Grand Rapids, Michigan, and has coached the Knights to four national championships.

He and his wife, Kerri, have four children: Kelsey, Kaitlin, Mckenzie, and Matthew, and two dogs named Jackson and Quigley, all of whom have followed in his athletic footsteps.  Kaitlin competed in the NCAA Division III 2010 Outdoor Track and Field Championships in the 4x400 meter relay. Mckenzie raced the steeplechase at NCAA Division III 2015 Outdoor Track and Field Championships running the 3rd best seed time in 10:36.

International competitions

(#) Indicates overall position achieved in the semis (s) or heats (h).

References
 

1961 births
Living people
American male middle-distance runners
American male steeplechase runners
Olympic bronze medalists for the United States in track and field
Athletes (track and field) at the 1984 Summer Olympics
Athletes (track and field) at the 1988 Summer Olympics
Athletes (track and field) at the 1992 Summer Olympics
Athletes (track and field) at the 1995 Pan American Games
Sportspeople from Grand Rapids, Michigan
Track and field athletes from Michigan
Michigan Wolverines men's track and field athletes
Medalists at the 1984 Summer Olympics
Pan American Games medalists in athletics (track and field)
Pan American Games silver medalists for the United States
Goodwill Games medalists in athletics
Competitors at the 1990 Goodwill Games
Medalists at the 1995 Pan American Games